Ulei Airport is an airport in Ulei, Ambrym, Vanuatu .

Airlines and destinations

References

Airports in Vanuatu
Malampa Province